Pervomaysky is a rural locality (a selo) in Sterlibashevsky Selsoviet, Sterlibashevsky District, Bashkortostan, Russia. The population was 716 as of 2010. There are 10 streets.

Geography 
Pervomaysky is located 4 km northeast of Sterlibashevo (the district's administrative centre) by road. Sterlibashevo is the nearest rural locality.

References 

Rural localities in Sterlibashevsky District